Ekkirala Krishnamacharya (11 August 1926 - 17 March 1984) was an Indian spiritual guru, university lecturer, homeopathy practitioner, and writer from Andhra Pradesh. He is also called as Master E.K. by his disciples. Born in a family of Vedic scholar, he completed his education in literature, and worked as a lecturer in university. He also used to practice homeopathy and established over 100 free dispensaries to serve the poor. He was the founder of the World Teacher Trust in 1971.

Life 
Krishnamacharya was born on 11 August 1926 in Bapatla, Madras Presidency of India (now in Andhra Pradesh). His father Ekkirala Ananthacharya was a Vedic scholar, and Ayurvedic doctor. His mother Bucchamma was a house wife. He is the eldest son among four children. He lost his mother when he was 13 years old. He had three younger brothers. His father did not send any of his children to formal school. He felt modern education limit their creative potential and make them automatons. Krishnamacharya studied vedas and their intricacies under the guidance of his father. At the age of just five years, he was able to convince some members of Brahma samaj, who visited their father, about the existence of god in the temples. He used to write poetry from his childhood. His poetry got accolades from the Jnanpith Award winning Telugu poet Viswanatha Satyanarayana. After his school education, he got admitted into a university for postgraduate  studies in literature. He used to rigorously practice Gayatri Mantra on weekends when there were no classes.

Family 
He is married to Appamma. His three younger brothers are Ekkirala Vedavyasa, Ekkirala Bodhayana, and Ekkirala Bharadwaja. Ekkirala Vedavyasa was selected for Indian Administrative Services (IAS) and wrote several books. Ekkirala Bharadwaja was also a spiritual master and often called Sai Master by his disciples.

Profession 
After his collegiate education, he was appointed as a lecturer of Telugu in a college in Guntur. He constantly had visions of a personality whenever he sits for chanting of Gayatri Mantra. He later found him to be Master C. V. V. whom he accepted as his spiritual Guru.

Organizations 
He established many spiritual centers in India, and western Europe. He also started schools, and homeopathic dispensaries in India where the poor is treated for free. He has also inspired his followers to serve the needy. He had disciples from India and other countries as well.

He started the Theosophy related World Teacher Trust (WTT) on 18 November 1971 in Visakhapatnam. WTT combines ideas from Theosophical society with a strong emphasis on homeopathic medicine.

References

External links 
 Website dedicated to Master EK and his teachings
 Website of World Teacher Trust Founded by Ekkirala Krishnamacharya
 Youtube playlist about some aspects of his life

1926 births
1984 deaths
Telugu people
People from Guntur district
Indian spiritual teachers